The DAD–SAS model is a macroeconomic model based on the AD-AS model but that looks at the different incomes at different inflation levels.

DAD curve
The DAD (Dynamic aggregate demand) curve is in the long run a horizontal line called the EAD (Equilibrium aggregate Demand) curve.
The short run DAD curve at flexible exchange rates is given by the equation:

The short run DAD curve at fixed exchange rates is given by the equation:

SAS curve
The SAS (Surprise aggregate supply) curve is in the long run a vertical line called the EAS (Equilibrium aggregate Supply) curve.
The short run SAS curve is given by the equation:

Keynesian economics
Economics models

de:DAD-SAS-Modell